Clare Shore (born 1954) is an American composer, music educator mezzo-soprano, and conductor.

Biography
Clare Shore studied composition with Annette LeSiege, voice with Donald Hoirup, and oboe and saxophone with Davidson Burgess, graduating with a Bachelor of Arts degree from Wake Forest University in 1976. She continued her studies in composition with Charles Eakin and Cecil Effinger, and voice with Louis Cunningham, graduating with a Master of Music degree in 1977 from the University of Colorado at Boulder. She studied with David Diamond, Vincent Persichetti, Roger Sessions, and later with Gunther Schuller and earned a Doctor of Musical Arts degree in composition from the Juilliard School in 1984.

In addition to her work as a composer, Shore has taught music at The Juilliard School, Fordham University, Manhattan School of Music, the University of Virginia, George Mason University and Palm Beach Atlantic University. Her compositions have been performed internationally. She resides in West Palm Beach, Florida.

Honors and awards
Irving Berlin Fellowship in Memory of Jerome Kern
Alexandre Gretchaninov Memorial Award
Grant to Young Composers 1983
ASCAP Standard Awards since 1982
Composers Assistance Grants from the American Music Center
MacDowell Colony Fellowship
Atlantic Center for the Arts fellowship
Artist-in-Education Grant from the Virginia Commission for the Arts
Contemporary Record Society grant
Composer Fellowship from the National Endowment for the Arts

Works
Shore composes for orchestra, chamber ensemble, choral performance and solo voice. Selected works include:
Concerto for Bassoon and String Orchestra, 1985
Intermezzo, 1984
Angels from the Sand for Violin, Guitar and Horn in F, 1993
Brass Quintet, 1985
Canonic Polemic for Clarinet, 'Cello and Piano, 1985
Cool Spring Meditations for Guitar, 1987
Cycle de Vie for Bassoon and String Quartet, 1989
Four Dickinson Songs for Soprano and Woodwind Quintet, 1982
Game Piece #1 for Brass Quintet
July Remembrances for Soprano and Chamber Orchestra, 1981
Les Soeurs for Flute and Bassoon
Maya's Song for Mezzo-soprano, Synth. & Perc. (text by Maya Angelou) 1988
Nightwatch for Woodwind Quintet, 1983
Oatlands Sketches for Organ, 1986
Prelude and Variations for Piano, 1981
Queen Esther for Bb Clarinet, Narrator and Dancer
Rebecca's Gift for Violin, 'Cello and Piano
Rondo for Bells (4 octave set) 1977
Rules for Solo Melody Instrument
Woodwind Quintet, 1978

Shore's works are recorded on the CRS, Owl Recordings, and Opus One labels. Selected recordings include:The Prism Orchestra Audio CD (January 1, 1990) Owl Recording, Inc., ASIN: B0000WVWX2Nocturnos De La Ventana/July Remembrances Audio CD (April 16, 1995) Owl Recordings, Inc. ASIN: B000009JOUNightwatch, Opus OneOatlands Sketches''

References

1954 births
Living people
20th-century classical composers
American music educators
American women music educators
American women classical composers
American classical composers
Operatic mezzo-sopranos
Wake Forest University alumni
University of Colorado Boulder alumni
Juilliard School alumni
Juilliard School faculty
Fordham University faculty
Manhattan School of Music faculty
University of Virginia faculty
George Mason University faculty
Palm Beach Atlantic University faculty
National Endowment for the Arts Fellows
20th-century American women singers
20th-century American singers
20th-century American composers
20th-century women composers
20th-century American women musicians
American women academics
21st-century American women